Francisco is the Spanish and Portuguese form of the masculine given name Franciscus.

Nicknames 
In Spanish, people with the name Francisco are sometimes nicknamed "Paco". San Francisco de Asís was known as Pater Comunitatis (father of the community) when he founded the Franciscan order, and "Paco" is a short form of Pater Comunitatis. 

In areas of Spain where Basque is spoken, "Patxi" is the most common nickname; in the Catalan areas, "Cesc" (short for Francesc) is often used. In Spanish Latin America and in the Philippines, people with the name Francisco are frequently called "Pancho". "Kiko" is also used as a nickname, and "Chicho" is another possibility.

In Portuguese, people named Francisco are commonly nicknamed "Chico" (shíco). This is also a less-common nickname for Francisco in Spanish.

People with the given name
 Pope Francis is rendered in the Spanish and Portuguese languages as Papa Francisco
 Francisco Acebal (1866–1933), Spanish writer and author
 Francisco Alves Mendes Filho Cena (1944–1988), known as Chico Mendes, Brazilian rubber tapper, unionist and environmental activist
 Francisco Anysio de Oliveira Paula Filho (1966–1997), known as Chico Anysio, Brazilian actor, comedian, writer and composer
 Francisco de Assis França, known as Chico Science, Brazilian singer and composer and one of the founders of the Mangue Beat cultural movement
 Francisco (slave) (died 1876), black slave who killed his masters and the last person executed by Brazil
 Francisco Ayala (disambiguation), several people
 Francisco J. Ayala (1934–2023), Spanish-American biologist and philosopher
 Francisco de Borja Echeverría (1848–1904), Chilean diplomat and politician
 Francisco Buarque de Hollanda, popularly known as Chico Buarque, Brazilian singer, guitarist, composer, dramatist, writer and poet
 Francisco Cabrera (cyclist), Chilean track and road cyclist
 Francisco Caamaño Domínguez (born 1963), Spanish politician
 Francisco Carreón, Filipino revolutionary who was the former vice president of the short-lived Tagalog Republic that existed from 1902–1906
 Francisco Cerúndolo (born 1998), Argentine tennis player
 Francisco Dagohoy, Filipino who started a rebellion against Spain that endured for 85 years
 Francisco Denis, Venezuelan actor and director
 Francisco Javier Duarte, Laser physicist
 Francisco Flores (disambiguation), several people
 Francisco Fonseca, Mexican football (soccer) player
 Francisco Franco, Spanish dictator (1939–1975)
 Francisco García, Dominican basketball player
 Francisco Hudson (1826–1859), Chilean navy officer and hydrographer
 Francisco Infante-Arana (born 1943), Russian painter
 Francisco de Jesus, Brazilian boxer
 Francisco Jiménez (born 1943), Mexican-American author
 Francisco Leal (1968-) Spanish sprint canoer
 Francisco Lachowski, Brazilian model
 Francisco Liaño, Spanish footballer
 Francisco Lindor, MLB shortstop
 Francisco Liriano, MLB starting pitcher
 Francisco Marto, Fatima visionary
 Francisco Morales, Argentine judoka
 Francisco Macías Nguema, later Africanized his name to Masie Nguema Biyogo Ñegue Ndong, former dictator of Equatorial Guinea 
 Francisco Olivencia (1934–2019), Spanish lawyer and politician
 Francisco de Orellana (1511–1546), Spanish explorer and conquistador
 Francisco de Paula Cândido (1910–2002), known as Chico Xavier, medium in Brazil's spiritism movement
 Francisco Pizarro, Spanish conquistador
 Francisco Rodríguez (baseball, born 1982), (K-Rod) MLB closing pitcher
 Francisco Rodríguez Adrados (1922–2020), Spanish hellenist
 Francisco Rotllán, Mexican football (soccer) player
 Francisco Rubio Llorente (1930–2016), Spanish jurist
 Francisco Santos (disambiguation), several people
 Francisco Sardinha, Indian politician, former Chief Minister of Goa and member of the Indian National Congress
 Francisco Vásquez de Coronado, Spanish conquistador
 Francisco Velázquez, former Argentine roller hockey player
 Francisco Lachowski, Brazilian fashion model
 Francisco Victoria, Mexican independence fighter
 Francisco Vidal (disambiguation), several people
 Francisco Vidal (Chilean politician), Chilean politician
 Francisco González Gómez (1918–1990), Spanish caricaturist, painter and sculptor who used the pseudonym of Francisco
 Weerahannadige Francisco Fernando (1812–1848), Sri Lankan Sinhala independence revolutionary

As a surname 
 Aaron Francisco, American football player
 Antônio Francisco (1923–1997), better known as Nininho, Brazilian football player
 Botong Francisco (1912–1969), Filipino painter
 Frank Francisco, Dominican professional baseball pitcher
 João Francisco, Brazilian football player
 Jason Francisco, Filipino actor and comedian
 Manuel Francisco, South African professional snooker player
 Noel Francisco, American attorney, Solicitor General of the United States (2017–2020)
 Osmar Francisco, Brazilian footballer
 Pablo Francisco, American stand-up comedian
 Peter Francisco (1760–1831), American Revolutionary War soldier
 Peter Francisco (snooker player), South African professional snooker player
 Sergio Francisco, Spanish footballer
 Silvino Francisco, South African professional snooker player

Fictional characters 
 Francisco d'Anconia, a character in Ayn Rand's novel Atlas Shrugged
 Francisco Ramon, a superhero in the DC Comics (sometimes called Paco Ramon)
 Francisco Scaramanga, the main antagonist of Ian Fleming's last novel, The Man with the Golden Gun (1964) and the subsequent film adaption from 1974 
 Judge Francisco, supporting character in the Judge Dredd comic strip

References 

Spanish masculine given names
Portuguese masculine given names

fr:Francisco
nl:Francisco
ja:フランシスコ
nds:Francisco